Andrus Aug (born 22 May 1972) is a retired Estonian professional road bicycle racer. He last rode for UCI Professional Continental team Ceramica Flaminia.

Major results 

1995
 2nd Road race, National Road Championships
1996
 1st  Road race, National Road Championships
 1st Stage 7 Rapport Toer
1997
 3rd Road race, National Road Championships
1999
 2nd Road race, National Road Championships
2001
 1st Trophy Riviera 3
 1st GP Città di Rio Saliceto e Correggio
 1st Stages 1 & 5 Course de la Solidarité Olympique
 1st Stages 1, 7, 8, 9 & 13 Tour of Maroc
 1st Stage 5 Tour of Bulgaria
 3rd Road race, National Road Championships
2002
 1st Gran Premio Nobili Rubinetterie
 1st Poreč Trophy 4
 1st Trofeo Città di Borgomanero
 1st Stage 2 Tour of Poland
 1st Stage 9 Peace Race
 1st Stage 1 Course de la Solidarité Olympique
 1st Stage 4 Tour of Slovakia
 1st Stage 3 Jadranska Magistrala
 2nd E.O.S. Tallinn GP
 5th Giro del Lago Maggiore
2004
 1st GP de la Ville de Rennes
 2nd GP Costa degli Etruschi
2005
 1st Stage 4 Giro del Trentino
 1st Stage 4 Saaremaa Velotuur
 2nd Tartu GP
2006
 1st Overall Saaremaa Velotuur
1st Stages 2, 5 & 6
 4th GP Costa degli Etruschi
2007
 1st Stage 4 Saaremaa Velotuur
 7th Riga GP
2008
 5th Riga GP

External links 

1972 births
Living people
Sportspeople from Jõgeva
Estonian male cyclists
Olympic cyclists of Estonia
Cyclists at the 2004 Summer Olympics